The MacGregor 21 is  an American trailerable sailboat that was designed by Roger MacGregor as a racer-cruiser and first built in 1980.

The MacGregor 21 is a development of the Venture 21.

Production
The design was built by MacGregor Yacht Corporation in the United States, from 1980 until 1985, but it is now out of production.

Design
The MacGregor 21 is a recreational keelboat, built predominantly of fiberglass, with wood trim. It has a masthead sloop rig, a spooned raked stem, a slightly angled transom, a transom-hung rudder controlled by a tiller and a retractable swing keel. It displaces  and carries  of cast iron ballast.

The boat is normally fitted with a small  outboard motor for docking and maneuvering.

The design has sleeping accommodation for four people, with a double "V"-berth in the bow cabin and two straight settee berths in the main cabin.

See also
List of sailing boat types

Related development
Venture 21

References

External links
Photo of a MacGregor 21

Keelboats
1980s sailboat type designs
Sailing yachts 
Trailer sailers
Sailboat type designs by Roger MacGregor
Sailboat types built by the MacGregor Yacht Corporation